Every Ballad Songs is the second best of album of the Japanese pop group Every Little Thing, released on December 5, 2001.

Track listing
"Over And Over"
"Time Goes By"
"Ai no Kakera (愛のカケラ ; Fragment of Love?)"  
"Azayaka na Mono (鮮やかなもの?)"  
"Futari de Jidai o Kaete Mitai (二人で時代を変えてみたい?)"  
"Ima Demo... Anata ga Suki Dakara (今でも・・・あなたが好きだから?)"   
"I'll Get over You"
"Fragile"
"The One Thing"
"One"
"Sure"
"All along"

BONUS CD
※Only Limited Edition
"Silent Night" (ELT Special Version)
"White Christmas" (ELT Special Version)

Chart positions 

2001 compilation albums
Every Little Thing (band) compilation albums